The 1954 United States Senate election in Nebraska took place on November 2, 1954. The Republican Representative, Carl Curtis, was elected for the first time. He defeated former governor Keith Neville. 2 other Senate elections in Nebraska were held on the same day; the special election to finish Dwight Griswold's term, and the special election to finish Hugh A. Butler's term. Curtis was appointed to the Senate before his elected term, on January 1, 1955, following the resignation of incumbent Senator Hazel Abel.

Democratic primary

Candidates
Keith Neville, former Governor of Nebraska (1917-1919)

Results

Republican primary

Candidates
Terry Carpenter, State Senator for the 42nd district
Robert B. Crosby, Governor of Nebraska
Carl Curtis, Representative for Nebraska's 1st district
David Martin, member of the Nebraska Republican Committee

Results

Results

References 

1954
Nebraska
United States Senate